Northam railway station may refer to:

Northam railway station (Devon), England
Northam railway station (Hampshire), England
Northam railway station, Western Australia

See also
 Northam (disambiguation)